Grases (variant: San Vicente de Grases) is one of 41 parishes (administrative divisions) in Villaviciosa, a municipality within the province and autonomous community of Asturias, in northern Spain. 

The postal code is 33313.

Villages and hamlets

Etymology

Xosé Lluis García Arias, in his book "Pueblos Asturianos:  El Porqué de Sus Nombres" ("Asturian People:  The Reasons Behind the Names"), explains the etymological significance for Grases and the people of the parroquia:

Grases: This is an anthroponym, or a toponym derived from the name of a person.  It was probably attributed to the village before the formation of the present population . García Arias proposes that the name is derived from the Latin word CRASSUS.

El Mayorazo: According to García Arias, this refers to "the old civil institution where a family could perpetually enjoy certain patrimonial goods" (translated from Spanish). Mayorazu is derived from a combination of the Latin MAIOREM (higher) and the suffix -ACEUM.

External links
 official site

See also
 Demographics of Spain

References 

Parishes in Villaviciosa

de:Grases